"Know Your Enemy" is a protest song by American rock band Green Day. It is the third track on their eighth album, 21st Century Breakdown, and it was released as the lead single through Reprise Records on April 16, 2009, and the group's first single since "Jesus of Suburbia", released 4 years earlier. Billboard described the song as being lyrically "just as politically charged as last time (on American Idiot)", having a "Modern Rock radio-ready chorus", whilst the song's producer Butch Vig "brings enough punk sheen for mass appeal." It was the first, and one of only three songs, to top the Rock Songs, Alternative Songs and Mainstream Rock Tracks Billboard charts at the same time. "Know Your Enemy" has been certified Gold by the RIAA and has sold 798,000 copies as of August 2010.

Release and reception
It was referred to by Spin as sounding "like an out-take from the Dookie sessions". About.com's Bill Lamb said the song was "standard issue Green Day", "not a stroke of genius" and "not on par with their last album", but said it was a "great appetizer" for one of the most eagerly awaited albums of 2009. Pitchfork Media described the track as having "pedantic stiffness" and "nothing more than a rote protest song preaching to the converted". Rolling Stone called the song one of the highlights of the album, praising the punk-oriented sound and calling it one of the "Clash-size bootboy chants" [from the album]. Billboard said that "The lead single from the band's new release, 21st Century Breakdown, finds the group just as politically charged as last time", but also said that "While the subject matter is broad and may be missed by some, "Enemy" has enough charm to amp up the airwaves until (21st Century) Breakdown is released."

Billie Joe Armstrong told Q, "It’s a rallying song. It’s about liberating yourself from a lot of bullshit that you see on TV." The song managed to top both the Billboard Mainstream and Alternative Songs charts at the same time, while cracking the Top 30 on the Billboard Hot 100, so far reaching number 28. The song entered the Alternative Songs chart at number eight and rose to number one in its second week. It kept the top spot for six weeks. It became available as a downloadable song for the music video game Rock Band on July 7, 2009, along with the songs "East Jesus Nowhere" and "21 Guns" and is also featured on the soundtrack to the video game NHL 10. It has been used on the trailers for movies The Spy Next Door and Free Birds as well as being used to promote Comcast and the Wimbledon on ESPN.

During their 21st Century Breakdown tour show in Minneapolis on July 11, 2009, Billie Joe Armstrong told the crowd that the song had been recorded on the first day of the Republican National Convention in Saint Paul, MN.

Usage in media

"Know Your Enemy" was used as the theme song for WWE SmackDown since the show's debut on Syfy from 2010-2012.

It is also played at Green Bay Packers games when the away team comes out of the locker room.

FC Halifax Town also use this as their walk out song when playing at home.

The song is also featured on the Awesome as Fuck live album.

The song appears in Shaun White Skateboarding and as DLC for the Rock Band video game series.

Music video
The music video was directed by Motion Theory's Mathew Cullen (who helmed the video for Weezer's "Pork and Beans" in 2008), and it premiered on MTV and other stations across the globe on April 24, 2009. In the video, the band is performing at night on a stage in a field surrounded by a barbed wire fence. Shots of the band are also frequently seen through night vision closed-circuit cameras that surround the field, as well as on helicopters that patrol the area with searchlights. The final chorus of the song shows fire burning behind the band in silhouettes of the band members (Billie Joe has a man with a guitar behind him, Tré Cool has a man playing the drums behind him, Mike Dirnt has a man playing bass behind him). The video was shot in Downtown Los Angeles.

Track listing

Charts

Weekly charts

Year-end charts

Certifications

Personnel
 Billie Joe Armstrong - guitar, lead vocals
 Mike Dirnt - bass guitar, backing vocals
 Tré Cool - drums, percussion

References

Green Day songs
2009 singles
Songs written by Billie Joe Armstrong
Song recordings produced by Butch Vig
WWE SmackDown
2008 songs
2009 songs
Reprise Records singles
Songs about television
Songs written by Mike Dirnt
Songs written by Tré Cool